Passion is a 1940 German drama film directed by Walter Janssen and starring Olga Tschechowa, Hans Stüwe and Paul Otto.

The film's sets were designed by the art director Gabriel Pellon and Heinrich Richter. It was partly shot on location in Tyrol.

Cast
 Olga Tschechowa as Gerda
 Hans Stüwe as Hans Strobel
 Paul Otto as Graf Hubert
 Hilde Körber as Leni
 Traudl Stark as Angelika
 Fritz Rasp as Boddin
 Hubert von Meyerinck as Graf Christian
 Otto Gebühr as Dr. Myrbach
 Hans Junkermann as Dr. Hermann
 Ilse Abel
 Lina Carstens
 Will Dugal
 Karl Etlinger
 Hilde Larsen
 Paul Mederow
 Hellmuth Passarge
 Paul Rehkopf
 Georg H. Schnell
 F.W. Schröder-Schrom
 Bruno Ziener

References

Bibliography 
 Bock, Hans-Michael & Bergfelder, Tim. The Concise CineGraph. Encyclopedia of German Cinema. Berghahn Books, 2009.

External links 
 

1940 films
Films of Nazi Germany
German drama films
1940 drama films
1940s German-language films
Films directed by Walter Janssen
Terra Film films
German black-and-white films
1940s German films